Bhitia is a village 20 km from the district headquarters of Banka in Bihar, India. It is full of greenery and famous for its beautiful hills. The village has a big talab which attracts large numbers of immigrant birds. The village is 30 km from the Ganges.it is famous for fish production also

The Naiyasi Tola of the area is the village of veteran leaderJai Prakash Mishra. Bhitia is the village of the homeopathic doctor, the late Dr. Rameshwar Mishra.It was in this soil that the major freedom fighter Shridhar Singh was born. Shridhar Singh hoisted the flag at the treasury at the age of 14. He was part of several major movements of the freedom struggle. Bibhanshu Singh grandson of Shridhar babu has written book "Viplvi Banka". .

One of the distinctive features of the region is its proximity from Deoghar (one among the 12 Jyotirlingas).

The linking road of "Uttarvahini Ganga" and "Babadham Deoghar" is 5 km from the village.

There is a Kali temple in the center of the village headquarters. Pilgrims visit there to worship Maa Kali. On the occasion of Dipawali, a Mela is organised. Kedia village of the locality has a famous old tree known as Dubethan.

Kamlesh Singh, and Rajesh Kumar noted journalist, was born in this village. Mrs.Babita Bharti was elected in last Panchayat election as a Mukhiya of Bhitia.

Agriculture
Paddy, wheat, maize, lentil.

River
Lohagad

Hills
Nada, Ramsariya

Language
Angika

Villages in Banka district